The Ven. Wilfrid Langton Kissack (b Isle of Man 9 October 1873; d Georgetown, Guyana 24 August 1942) was an Anglican priest in the Caribbean in the first half of the 20th century.

Kissack was educated at Emmanuel College, Cambridge. He was ordained in 1898. After curacies at New Milverton ( a suburb of Leamington Spa) and Bowes Park he went out to South America. He held incumbencies in Paramaribo, Vreed en Hoop and Georgetown. He was Archdeacon of Demerara from 1927 until his death.

References

Alumni of Emmanuel College, Cambridge
20th-century Guyanese Anglican priests
19th-century Guyanese Anglican priests
Archdeacons of Demerara
1873 births
1942 deaths
19th-century Manx Anglican priests